Beaver's Hill Halt railway station served the town of Tenby, Pembrokeshire, Wales, from 1905 to 1964 on the Pembroke and Tenby Railway.

History 
The station opened on 1 May 1905 by the Great Western Railway. It closed in September 1908 for the winter but it was still used by workmen for Pembroke Dock. It closed again on 22 September 1914 but reopened on 1 December 1923, before closing permanently on 14 June 1964.

References

External links 

Disused railway stations in Pembrokeshire
Former Great Western Railway stations
Railway stations in Great Britain opened in 1905
Railway stations in Great Britain closed in 1914
Railway stations in Great Britain opened in 1923
Railway stations in Great Britain closed in 1964
1905 establishments in Wales
1964 disestablishments in Wales
Beeching closures in Wales